Charleston is an unincorporated community in southwestern Hopkins County, Kentucky, United States.

According to legend, it was named for "Free Charles", a former slave, who kept a tavern there. A Charleston post office was in operation from 1855 to 1909.

References

Unincorporated communities in Kentucky
Populated places in Hopkins County, Kentucky